Azra was a Croatian and Yugoslav rock band that was one of the most popular acts of the Yugoslav new wave music of the 1980s. Azra was formed in 1977 by its frontman Branimir "Johnny" Štulić. The other two members of the original line-up were Mišo Hrnjak (bass) and Boris Leiner (drums). The band is named after a verse  from "Der Asra" by Heinrich Heine. They are considered to be one of the most influential bands from the Yugoslav new wave rock era and the Yugoslav rock scene in general.

They released their first single in 1979 with songs "Balkan" and "A šta da radim". The first album named Azra was published in 1980 and achieved commercial success and popularized Azra in Yugoslavia. Their second album was released in 1981. Azra recorded its last studio album Između krajnosti (Between the Extremes) in 1987. In 1988 the band recorded 4LP live album under the name Zadovoljština (Satisfaction), after which Štulić disbanded the band. Štulić recorded three more solo albums since moving to the Netherlands, where he lives in seclusion. A 2003 rock documentary, Sretno dijete depicts Azra as the focus of the rock scene in Yugoslavia during the 1980s, along with Bijelo dugme. Even today, Azra remains very popular among youth in the countries of the former Yugoslavia.

In 1998, the music critics compiled a list of 100 best albums of Yugoslav pop and rock music. Five Azra albums were included, three of them in top 10. On the Radio B92's list of 100 greatest songs of former Yugoslavia, four Azra songs were included, all of them in top 20.

Members
Branimir "Johnny" Štulić – vocals, guitar
Branko Matun – bass (1977)
Paolo Sfeci – drums (1977)
Mladen Jurčić – guitar (1977–1978)
Branko Hromatko – drums (1977–1978)
Marino Pelajić – bass (1977–1978)
Jura Stublić – vocals (1978)
Boris Leiner (ex Kanibali) – drums, vocals (from 1979)
Mišo Hrnjak – bass (1979–1982)
Jurica Pađen – guitars (1983–1984, from 1987)
Stephen Kipp – bass (from 1986)

Timeline

Discography

Studio albums
Azra (Jugoton, 1980)
Sunčana strana ulice (Jugoton, 1981)
Filigranski pločnici (Jugoton, 1982)
Kad fazani lete (Jugoton, 1983)
Krivo srastanje (Jugoton, 1984)
It Ain't Like In The Movies At All (Diskoton, 1986)
Između krajnosti (Jugoton, 1987)

Live albums
 Ravno do dna (Jugoton, 1982)
 Zadovoljština (Jugoton, 1988)

Compilation albums
 Singl ploče 1979-1982  (Jugoton, 1982)
 Kao i jučer – singl ploče 1983-1986  (Jugoton, 1986)
 Nikom nije lepše (Hi-Fi Centar, 1998)
 The Ultimate Collection (Croatia Records, 2007)

Singles
 "Balkan" (The Balkans) / "A šta da radim" (And What Should I Do?) – (Jugoton 1979)
 "Lijepe žene prolaze kroz grad" (Pretty Women Passing Through Town), "Poziv na ples" (An Invitation to Dance) / "Suzy F". – (Jugoton, 1980)
 "Đoni, budi dobar" (Johnny Be Good) / "Teško vrijeme" (Hard Time) – (Jugoton 1982)
 "E, pa što" (So What) / "Sloboda" (Freedom) / "Gluperde lutaju daleko" (Jerks Wander Far) – (Jugoton 1982)
 "Nemir i strast" (Restlessness and Passion) / "Doviđenja na Vlaškom drumu" (Farewell on the Valachian Road) – (Jugoton 1983)
 Klinček stoji pod oblokom (A Carnation Grows Under the Window ) / Flash (Jugoton 1983.) from the album "Krivo srastanje"
 Mon ami / Duboko u tebi (My Love/Deep Inside You) (Jugoton 1984.) from the album "Krivo srastanje"
 "The Balkans" / "Pretty Women Passing Through Town" / "Vondel Park"  (Marginal Face Production 1985)

Videography
 Zadovoljština (Zagreb, live concert, 1988)
 Klincek stoji pod oblokom (Video compilation, 1990)
 Das Ist Johnny (Sarajevo, live film, 1991)

References

External links 
  – Azra YouTube Channel

Croatian rock music groups
Croatian new wave musical groups
Yugoslav rock music groups
Musical groups established in 1977
Musical groups disestablished in 1990
Musicians from Zagreb